Shchekino is a rural locality (a village) in Andomskoye Rural Settlement, Vytegorsky District, Vologda Oblast, Russia. The population was 62 as of 2002. There are 3 streets.

Geography 
Shchekino is located 26 km north of Vytegra (the district's administrative centre) by road. Panshino is the nearest rural locality.

References 

Rural localities in Vytegorsky District